The 1960–61 Hovedserien was the 17th completed season of top division football in Norway.

Overview
It was contested by 16 teams, and Fredrikstad won the championship, their second consecutive league title and ninth title overall.

Teams and locations
Note: Table lists in alphabetical order.

League tables

Group A

Group B

Results

Group A

Group B

Championship final
Fredrikstad 2–0 Eik

Bronze final
Vålerengen 6–4 Lyn

References
Norway - List of final tables (RSSSF)

Eliteserien seasons
Norway
1960 in Norwegian football
1961 in Norwegian football